The Incredible Machine 2 is a video game released in 1994 for DOS, and part of The Incredible Machine video game series. The Incredible Machine Version 3.0 (also marketed as Professor Tim's Incredible Machines) was released in 1995 for Mac OS and Windows containing the same levels as The Incredible Machine 2, but with an improved interface and added extra features like CD music tracks. Re-releases of the series, including the 2009 compilation The Incredible Machine Mega Pack, have included Version 3.0.

Gameplay
The Incredible Machine 2 introduced new levels, an extended assortment of parts, a new interface, significantly improved graphics, sounds, and music, and two player hotseat play. It also improved on the "freeform" mode, allowing players to create completely playable puzzles by defining not only the participating parts, but also the set of circumstances under which the puzzle will be considered "solved". In terms of gameplay, this version provided the biggest addition to the series, while subsequent updates were basically only ports of the game to newer operating systems with updated graphics/sounds and sometimes new puzzles, but no new parts.

Reception

Reviewing The Incredible Machine 2, Gary Meredith of PC Gamer US wrote: "In every way, TIM2 is an improvement, keeping the best parts of the original yet giving the player more options and flexibility". He summarized it as "a game that's as rewarding as it is challenging". The Incredible Machine 2 won Computer Gaming Worlds Readers' Choice award for the best "Classics/Puzzles" game of 1995, although it was not among the editors' nominees.

Reviews
Computer Gaming World - April 1995
PC Player (Germany) - December 1994
PC Games - December 1995

References

External links

1994 video games
Classic Mac OS games
DOS games
Multiplayer and single-player video games
Multiplayer hotseat games
Puzzle video games
Sierra Entertainment games
Video game sequels
Video games developed in the United States
Video games scored by Christopher Stevens
Windows games